Cavanillesia platanifolia, known as pijio, bongo, pretino, petrino, cuipo, hameli or hamelí in Spanish or macondo,  is a flowering plant species in the family Malvaceae. It grows in lowland rainforests in Nicaragua, Costa Rica, Panama, Colombia, Ecuador, and Peru.

Its reddish-gray bark has characteristic rings along the entire trunk. The roots are orangish-brown.

A root fragment can be cut off and cleaned (while kept horizontal) then tipped to pour water, which has a taste of potatoes. Rope can be made from the inner bark of branches and saplings.

The wood is extremely soft and may have commercial applications. According to the Janka Hardness Test, along with balsa it is one of the softest.

References

Bombacoideae
Trees of Central America
Trees of South America
Near threatened flora of South America
Trees of Colombia
Trees of Costa Rica
Trees of Ecuador
Trees of Nicaragua
Trees of Panama
Trees of Peru
Taxa named by Alexander von Humboldt
Taxa named by Aimé Bonpland
Taxonomy articles created by Polbot